Blagoje Vidinić (11 June 1934 – 29 December 2006) was a Macedonian football coach, player, and Olympic participant of Serbian origin. He managed the national football teams of Morocco, Zaire, and Colombia.

Playing career

Club
Born in Skopje, he played his club football for FK Vardar, Radnički Beograd and OFK Beograd in Yugoslavia, and then with FC Sion of Switzerland. In 1967, he moved to the US to join the Los Angeles Toros of the National Professional Soccer League, making 20 appearances that season. He started the 1968 season with the relocated successor team San Diego Toros in the newly formed NASL, before moving to St. Louis Stars.

International
He played for Yugoslavia as a goalkeeper in the 1956 and 1960 Olympics, winning silver in the former and gold in the latter. He also played in the 1960 UEFA European Football Championship when Yugoslavia finished second. He earned 8 caps and his final international was an October 1960 friendly match against Hungary.

Managerial career
After retiring from playing, he became a coach, and managed two African teams in the FIFA World Cup: Morocco in 1970 and Zaire in 1974.

Honours

Player
FC Sion
 Swiss Cup: 1964–65

Yugoslavia
 Olympic Gold Medal: 1960

Manager
FAR Rabat
 Moroccan Throne Cup: 1971

Zaire
 Africa Cup of Nations: 1974

References

External links
 
 

1934 births
2006 deaths
Footballers from Skopje
Macedonian people of Serbian descent
Association football goalkeepers
Macedonian footballers
Yugoslav footballers
Yugoslavia international footballers
Footballers at the 1956 Summer Olympics
Footballers at the 1960 Summer Olympics
Olympic footballers of Yugoslavia
Olympic gold medalists for Yugoslavia
Olympic silver medalists for Yugoslavia
Medalists at the 1956 Summer Olympics
Medalists at the 1960 Summer Olympics
Olympic medalists in football
1960 European Nations' Cup players
FK Vardar players
FK Radnički Beograd players
OFK Beograd players
FC Sion players
Los Angeles Toros players
San Diego Toros players
St. Louis Stars (soccer) players
Yugoslav First League players
Swiss Super League players
National Professional Soccer League (1967) players
North American Soccer League (1968–1984) players
Yugoslav expatriate footballers
Yugoslav expatriate sportspeople in Switzerland
Expatriate footballers in Switzerland
Yugoslav expatriate sportspeople in the United States
Expatriate soccer players in the United States
Yugoslav expatriate sportspeople in Colombia
Yugoslav expatriate sportspeople in Morocco
Yugoslav expatriate sportspeople in the Democratic Republic of the Congo
Yugoslav football managers
Macedonian football managers
Morocco national football team managers
AS FAR (football) managers
Democratic Republic of the Congo national football team managers
Colombia national football team managers
1970 FIFA World Cup managers
1972 African Cup of Nations managers
1974 African Cup of Nations managers
1974 FIFA World Cup managers
1979 Copa América managers
Expatriate football managers in Morocco
Expatriate football managers in the Democratic Republic of the Congo
Expatriate football managers in Colombia